Velodyne Lidar is a Silicon Valley-based lidar technology company, headquartered in San Jose, California. It was spun off from Velodyne Acoustics in 2016. As of July 2020, the company has had about 300 customers.  Velodyne Lidar ships sensors to mobility industry customers for testing and commercial use in autonomous vehicles, advanced driver assistance systems, mapping, robotics, infrastructure and smart city applications. In February 2023, the company merged with Ouster.

History
David Hall founded Velodyne in 1983 as an audio company specializing in subwoofer technology.

Velodyne's experience with laser distance measurement started in 2005, when David Hall and his brother Bruce (then president of Velodyne) entered a vehicle in a driverless car race called DARPA Grand Challenge sponsored by the Defense Advanced Research Projects Agency (DARPA). The experience led them to realize shortcomings both in camera-centric approaches and in existing lidar technology, which only scanned a single, fixed line of sight. Velodyne developed new sensors for the 2007 race. The brothers sold their perception detection system as a steering input to five of the six teams that finished the 2007 race. The system rotated 64 lasers and measured the time of flight to calculate distances to surrounding objects. This created a 360-degree 3D map of the environment. The new system produced one million data points per second, while earlier systems produced 5,000 data points per second.

Velodyne donated one of its early prototype sensors to the Robotics Collection at the Smithsonian Institution's National Museum of American History in 2011.

In 2016, Velodyne's Lidar department was spun off from Velodyne Acoustics as Velodyne Lidar, Inc. On August 16, 2016, Velodyne announced a $150M investment from Ford and Baidu.

In 2017, Velodyne opened a factory in San Jose, California. The company also has an R&D center in Alameda, California. The same year, Velodyne also provided their sensors as a sponsor of the SAE GM AutoDrive Challenge, a three-year competition in which eight university teams develop an automated vehicle.

Since 2018, Velodyne has partnered with Mothers Against Drunk Driving in a campaign to promote the use of autonomous vehicles for improving roadway safety and preventing impaired driving deaths. Since October 2018, Velodyne has organized an annual World Safety Summit on Autonomous Technology. In the same year, the company also signed agreements to collaborate with Nikon and Veoneer for manufacturing and mass production.

In July 2019, the company acquired mapping and localization software as well as intellectual property assets from Mapper.ai.

In January 2020, Hall stepped down as CEO and was replaced by Anand Gopalan, who was previously CTO, although Hall initially remained chairman of the company's board of directors and continued to be the company's largest shareholder. On July 2, 2020, Velodyne Lidar merged with Graf Industrial Corp. to become a publicly-traded company. In September 2020, the company began trading stocks and warrants on NASDAQ under the ticker symbols VLDR and VLDRW.

In January 2021, Hall was censured by the company and removed as chairman of the board, and Hall's wife's employment at the company was terminated, as the relationship between the company and Hall together with Hall's wife Marta Thoma Hall became highly antagonistic, with the Halls and the company accusing each other of serious misconduct. However, Hall has retained a large stake in the company and his wife has remained on its board of directors.

In November 2021, Gopalan was replaced as CEO with Theodore Tewksbury, a former chief executive at a low-power AI vision systems company, Eta Compute.

On February 7, 2022, the company's stock price surged over 50 percent when the internet retailer Amazon agreed to invest in the company with the purchase of 40 million of its shares.

In November 2022, Ouster and Velodyne agreed to merge in an all-share transaction in which the combined business will be split evenly between the two companies' existing shareholders. The merger completed in February 2023, with the combined company retaining the Ouster name.

Technology

Applications for Velodyne Lidar's technology include autonomous vehicles, advanced driver assistance systems (ADASs), mapping, security, and unmanned aerial vehicles. Velodyne's sensors have a range of up to 300 meters and can be used for immediate object detection without additional sensor fusion. When in use on a moving vehicle, a Velodyne sensor can create a precise image of the road ahead, including detailed street signs and foliage.

In April 2017, Velodyne introduced its Velarray, a compact fixed-laser solid-state sensor that produces a directional image rather than the surround view provided by Velodyne's previous sensors. The range, resolution, and directional field of view of the Velarray enable improved object detection and longer braking distances than the company's prior 360° products. The initial Velarray was designed for vehicle integration and could be concealed in roof lines and bumpers and behind windshields.

Also in 2017, the company introduced the Alpha Puck (previously known as VLS-128) sensor with a range of up to 300 meters. This sensor is made for autonomous driving and advanced vehicle safety at highway speeds.

In 2019, Velodyne introduced the VelaDome, a compact embeddable lidar that provides a 180° x 180° field of view and supports near-object detection. The company also introduced Vella software for integration of the Velarray into ADAS applications, supporting features such as lane keeping assist, automatic emergency braking, and adaptive cruise control. In November 2019, Velodyne introduced a lidar sensor for improving vehicle safety and enabling precise mapping.

In 2020, Velodyne introduced the Velabit, the company's smallest sensor, the Velarray H800, a solid-state sensor built using a micro-lidar array architecture. and the Velarray M1600, a solid state sensor for mobile robots and last-mile delivery systems.

Partners and customers

In 2010, Google (now Alphabet) began testing self-driving cars on the streets in the San Francisco Bay Area using Velodyne's Lidar technology. Alphabet's first self-driving car prototype (built on Toyota's Prius model) used Velodyne's HDL-64E lidar sensor. Since then, Alphabet has stopped using Velodyne sensors in its vehicles.

In 2012, Velodyne Lidar signed a contract with Caterpillar for a supply of lidar sensors to be used for off-road vehicles. These sensors help Caterpillar map quarries, farms and work sites during construction.

From 2012 to 2015, Velodyne's spinning HDL-32E sensors were used on mobile mapping vehicles by Nokia Here, Microsoft Bing Maps, Tencent, Baidu, and TomTom. Mapping providers including Topcon and Leica Geosystems use Velodyne's scanners for their mobile services.

In 2016, Ford Motor Company announced that it will expand its fleet of self-driving R&D vehicles and use Velodyne Lidar's Ultra Puck sensors. As of December 31, 2020, Ford Motor Company liquidated its 7.6% stake in Velodyne Lidar.

In 2017, Velodyne partnered with Renovo as Reference Lidar provider for the AWare automated mobility operating system and with Mercedes-Benz for a perception system contract.

In 2018, the company partnered with Embark, Geodetics, Voyage, Exyn Technologies, Yellowscan, Phoenix Lidar,  NAVYA, ThorDrive and Postmates. Velodyne Lidar also partnered with Nikon, receiving an investment of $25M.

In 2019, Velodyne partnered with Clearpath Robotics, Holomatic, Kaarta and Hyundai Mobis.

In 2020, the company announced agreements with TLD, EasyMile, Emesent, Baidu and Local Motors.

References

External links
 

Lidar
Self-driving car companies
American companies established in 2016
Companies formerly listed on the Nasdaq
Companies based in San Jose, California
Corporate spin-offs
2016 establishments in California
Special-purpose acquisition companies
2023 mergers and acquisitions